Dybowo  is a village in the administrative district of Gmina Pasym, within Szczytno County, Warmian-Masurian Voivodeship, in northern Poland. 

The village has a population of 212.

References

Dybowo